The Journal of Physics A: Mathematical and Theoretical is a peer-reviewed scientific journal published by IOP Publishing. It is part of the Journal of Physics series and covers theoretical physics focusing on sophisticated mathematical and computational techniques. It was established in 1968 from the division of the earlier title, Proceedings of the Physical Society.

The journal is divided into six sections covering: statistical physics; chaotic and complex systems; mathematical physics; quantum mechanics and quantum information theory; classical and quantum field theory; fluid and plasma theory.

The editor in chief is Joseph A Minahan (Uppsala Universitet, Sweden). According to the Journal Citation Reports, the journal has a 2020 impact factor of 2.132.

Indexing
The journal is indexed in:

 Scopus
 Inspec
 Chemical Abstracts
 GeoRef
 INIS Atomindex
 Astrophysics Data System
 PASCAL
 Referativny Zhurnal
 Zentralblatt MATH
 Science Citation Index and SciSearch
 Current Contents/Physical, Chemical and Earth Sciences

See also
Journal of Physics: Condensed Matter

References

External links
 

Physics journals
Fluid dynamics journals
Publications established in 1968
IOP Publishing academic journals
English-language journals
Hybrid open access journals